The San Francisco–Oakland Bay Bridge, known locally as the Bay Bridge, is a complex of bridges spanning San Francisco Bay in California. As part of Interstate 80 and the direct road between San Francisco and Oakland, it carries about 260,000 vehicles a day on its two decks. It has one of the longest spans in the United States.

The toll bridge was conceived as early as the California Gold Rush days, with "Emperor" Joshua Norton famously advocating for it, but construction did not begin until 1933. Designed by Charles H. Purcell, and built by American Bridge Company, it opened on Thursday, November 12, 1936, six months before the Golden Gate Bridge. It originally carried automobile traffic on its upper deck, with trucks, cars, buses and commuter trains on the lower, but after the Key System abandoned rail service on April 20, 1958, the lower deck was converted to all-road traffic as well. On October 12, 1963, traffic was reconfigured to one way traffic on each deck, westbound on the upper deck, and eastbound on the lower deck, with trucks and buses allowed on the upper deck.

In 1986, the bridge was unofficially dedicated to former California Governor James Rolph.

The bridge has two sections of roughly equal length; the older western section, officially known as the Willie L. Brown Jr. Bridge (after former San Francisco Mayor and California State Assembly Speaker Willie L. Brown Jr.), connects downtown San Francisco to Yerba Buena Island, and the newer unnamed eastern section connects the island to Oakland. The western section is a double suspension bridge with two decks, westbound traffic being carried on the upper deck while eastbound is carried on the lower one. The largest span of the original eastern section was a cantilever bridge. 

During the 1989 Loma Prieta earthquake, a portion of the eastern section's upper deck collapsed onto the lower deck and the bridge was closed for a month. Reconstruction of the eastern section of the bridge as a causeway connected to a self-anchored suspension bridge began in 2002; the new eastern section opened September 2, 2013, at a reported cost of over $6.5 billion; the original estimate of $250 million was for a seismic retrofit of the existing span. Unlike the western section and the original eastern section of the bridge, the new eastern section is a single deck carrying all eastbound and westbound lanes. Demolition of the old east span was completed on September 8, 2018.

Description

The bridge consists of two crossings, east and west of Yerba Buena Island, a natural mid-bay outcropping inside San Francisco city limits. The western crossing between Yerba Buena and downtown San Francisco has two complete suspension spans connected at a center anchorage. Rincon Hill is the western anchorage and touch-down for the San Francisco landing of the bridge connected by three shorter truss spans. The eastern crossing, between Yerba Buena Island and Oakland, was a cantilever bridge with a double-tower span, five medium truss spans, and a 14-section truss causeway. Due to earthquake concerns, the eastern crossing was replaced by a new crossing that opened on Labor Day 2013. On Yerba Buena Island, the double-decked crossing is a  concrete viaduct east of the west span's cable anchorage, the  Yerba Buena Tunnel through the island's rocky central hill, another  concrete viaduct, and a longer curved high-level steel truss viaduct that spans the final  to the cantilever bridge.

The toll plaza on the Oakland side (since 1969 for westbound traffic only) has eighteen toll lanes, with all charges now made either through the FasTrak electronic toll collection system or through invoices mailed through the USPS, based on the license plate of the car per Department of Motor Vehicle records. Two full-time bus-only lanes bypass the toll booths and metering lights around the right (north) side of the toll plaza; other high occupancy vehicles can use these lanes during weekday morning and afternoon commute periods. The two far-left toll lanes are high-occupancy vehicle lanes during weekday commute periods.

During the morning commute hours, traffic congestion on the westbound approach from Oakland stretches back through the MacArthur Maze interchange at the east end of the bridge onto the three feeder highways, Interstate 580, Interstate 880, and I-80 toward Richmond. Since the number of lanes on the eastbound approach from San Francisco is structurally restricted, eastbound backups are also frequent during evening commute hours.

The western section of the Bay Bridge is currently restricted to motorized freeway traffic. Pedestrians, bicycles, and other non-freeway vehicles are not allowed to cross this section. A project to add bicycle/pedestrian lanes to the western section has been proposed but is not finalized. A Caltrans bicycle shuttle operates between Oakland and San Francisco during peak commute hours for $1.00 each way.

Freeway ramps next to the tunnel provide access to Yerba Buena Island and Treasure Island. Because the toll plaza is on the Oakland side, the western span is a de facto non-tolled bridge; traffic between the island and the main part of San Francisco can freely cross back and forth. Those who only travel from Oakland to Yerba Buena Island, and not the entire length to the main part of San Francisco, must pay the full toll.

History

San Francisco, at the entrance to the bay, was perfectly placed to prosper during the California Gold Rush. Almost all goods not produced locally arrived by ship. But after the first transcontinental railroad was completed in May 1869, San Francisco was on the wrong side of the Bay, separated from the new rail link. The fear of many San Franciscans was that the city would lose its position as the regional center of trade. The concept of a bridge spanning the San Francisco Bay had been considered since the Gold Rush days. Several newspaper articles during the early 1870s discussed the idea. In early 1872, a "Bay Bridge Committee" was hard at work on plans to construct a railroad bridge. The April 1872 issue of the San Francisco Real Estate Circular contained an item about the committee:

The self-proclaimed Emperor Norton saw fit to decree three times in 1872 that a suspension bridge be constructed to connect Oakland with San Francisco. In the third of these decrees, in September 1872, Norton, frustrated that nothing had happened, proclaimed:

Unlike most of Emperor Norton's eccentric ideas, his decree to build a bridge had wide public and political appeal. Yet the task was too much of an engineering and economic challenge, since the bay was too wide and too deep there. In 1921, over forty years after Norton's death, a tube was considered, but it became clear that one would be inadequate for vehicular traffic. Support for a trans-bay crossing finally grew in the 1920s with the increasing popularity and availability of the automobile.

Planning

A law became effective in 1929 to establish the California Toll Bridge Authority (Stats. 1929, Chap 763) and to authorize it and the State Department of Public Works to build a bridge connecting San Francisco and Alameda County (Stats. 1929, Chap 762).

A commission was appointed to evaluate the idea and various designs for a bridge across the Bay, the Hoover-Young Commission. Its conclusions were made public in 1930.

In January 1931, Charles H. Purcell, the State Highway Engineer of California, who had also served as the secretary of the Hoover-Young Commission, assumed the position of Chief Engineer for the Bay Bridge.

To make the bridge feasible, a route was chosen via Yerba Buena Island, which would reduce both the material and the labor needed. Since Yerba Buena Island was a U.S. Navy base at the time, the approval of the U.S. Congress, which regulates the armed services and supervises all naval and military bases, was necessary for this island to be used. After a great deal of lobbying, California received Congressional approval to use the island on February 20, 1931, subject to the final approval of the Departments of War, Navy and Commerce. Permits were immediately applied for from the 3 federal departments as required. The permits were granted in January, 1932, and formally presented in a ceremony on Yerba Buena Island on February 24, 1932.

On May 25, 1931, Governor James Rolph Jr. signed into law two acts: one providing for the financing of state bridges by revenue bonds, and another creating the San Francisco–Oakland Bay Bridge Division of the State Department of Public Works. On September 15, 1931, this new division opened its offices at 500 Sansome Street in San Francisco.

During 1931, a series of aerial photographs was taken of the chosen route for the bridge and its approaches.

The final design concept for the western span between San Francisco and Yerba Buena Island was still undecided in 1931, although the idea of a double-span suspension bridge was already favored.

In April 1932, the preliminary final plan and design of the bridge was presented by Chief Engineer Charles Purcell to Col. Walter E. Garrison, Director of the State Department of Public Works, and to Ralph Modjeski, head of the Board of Engineering Consultants. Both agencies approved and preparation of the final design proceeded. In 1932, Joseph R. Knowland, a former U.S. Congressman, traveled to Washington to help persuade President Herbert Hoover and the Reconstruction Finance Corporation to advance $62 million for the building of the bridge.

Construction

Before work got underway, 12 massive underwater telephone cables were moved 1,000 feet north of the proposed bridge route by crews of the Pacific Telephone and Telegraph Co. during the summer of 1931.

Construction began on July 9, 1933 after a groundbreaking ceremony attended by former president Herbert Hoover and local beauty queens. Ultimately, twenty-four men would die constructing the bridge.

The western section of the bridge between San Francisco and Yerba Buena Island presented an enormous engineering challenge. The solution was to construct a massive concrete anchorage halfway between San Francisco and the island, and to build a main suspension span on each side of this central anchorage.

East of Yerba Buena Island, the bay to Oakland was spanned by a  combination of double cantilever, five long-span through-trusses, and a truss causeway, forming the longest bridge of its kind at the time. The cantilever section was longest in the nation and third-longest anywhere.

Much of the original eastern section was founded upon treated wood pilings. Because of the very deep mud on the bay bottom it was not practical to reach bedrock, although the lower levels of the mud are quite firm. Long wooden pilings were crafted from entire old-growth Douglas fir trees, which were driven through the soft mud to the firmer bottom layers.

Approaches

The original western approach to (and exit from) the upper deck of the bridge was a long ramp to Fifth Street, branching to Harrison St for westward traffic off the bridge and Bryant St for eastward traffic entering. There was also an on-ramp to the upper deck on Rincon Hill from Fremont Street (which later became an off-ramp) and an off-ramp to First Street (later extended over First St to Fremont St). The lower deck ended at Essex and Harrison St; just southwest of there, the tracks of the bridge railway left the lower deck and curved northward into the elevated loop through the Transbay Terminal that was paved for buses after rail service ended.

The eastern approach to the bridge included a causeway landing for the "incline" section, and the construction of three feeder highways, interlinked by an extensive interchange, which in later years became known as "The MacArthur Maze". A massive landfill was emplaced, extending along the north edge of the existing Key System rail mole to the existing bayshore, and continuing northward along the shore to the foot of Ashby Avenue in Berkeley. The fill was continued northward to the foot of University Avenue as a causeway which enclosed an artificial lagoon, subsequently developed by the WPA as "Aquatic Park". The three feeder highways were U.S. Highway 40 (Eastshore Highway) which led north through Berkeley, U.S. Highway 50 (38th Street, later MacArthur Blvd.) which led through Oakland, and State Route 17 which ran parallel to U.S. 50, along the Oakland Estuary and through the industrial and port sections of the city.

Yerba Buena Tunnel

It is the largest diameter transportation bore tunnel in the world. The large amount of material that was excavated in boring the tunnel was used for a portion of the landfill over the shoals lying adjacent to Yerba Buena Island to its north, a project which created the artificial Treasure Island.

Reminders of the long-gone bridge railway survive along the south side of the lower Yerba Buena Tunnel. These are the regularly spaced refuge bays ("deadman holes"), escape alcoves common in all railway tunnels, along the wall, into which track maintenance workers could safely retreat if a train came along. (The north side, which always carried only motor traffic, lacks these holes.)

Opening day
The bridge opened on November 12, 1936, at 12:30 p.m. In attendance were the former US president Herbert Hoover, Senator William G. McAdoo, and the Governor of California, Frank Merriam. Governor Merriam opened the bridge by cutting gold chains across it with an acetylene cutting torch. The San Francisco Chronicle report of November 13, 1936, read:

The total cost was US$77 million. Before opening the bridge was blessed by Cardinal Secretary of State Eugene Cardinal Pacelli, later Pope Pius XII. Because it was in effect two bridges strung together, the western spans were ranked the second and third largest suspension bridges. Only the George Washington Bridge had a longer span between towers.

As part of the celebration a United States commemorative coin was produced by the San Francisco Mint. A half dollar, the obverse portrays California's symbol, the grizzly bear, while the reverse presents a picture of the bridge spanning the bay. A total of 71,369 coins were sold, some from the bridge's tollbooths.

Roadway plan

Until the 1960s, the upper deck ( wide between curbs) carried three lanes of traffic in each direction and was restricted to automobiles only. The lower deck carried three lanes of truck and bus traffic, with autos allowed, on the north side of the bridge. In the 1950s traffic lights were added to set the direction of travel in the middle lane, but there still remained no divider. Two interurban railroad tracks on the south half of the lower deck carried the electric commuter trains. In 1958 the tracks were replaced with pavement, but the reconfiguration to what the traffic eventually became did not take place until 1963.

The Federal highway on the bridge was originally a concurrency of U.S. Highway 40 and U.S. Highway 50. The bridge was re-designated as Interstate 80 in 1964, and the western ends of U.S. 40 and U.S. 50 are now in Silver Summit, Utah, and West Sacramento, California, respectively.

The off-ramp for Treasure Island and Yerba Buena Island is unusual in that it is on the left-hand side in the eastbound direction. This off ramp presents an unusual hazard – drivers must slow within the normal traffic flow and move into a very short off-ramp that ends in a short radius turn left turn; accordingly, a 15 MPH advisory is posted there. The turn has been further narrowed from its original design by the installation of crash pads on the island side. Eastbound and westbound on-ramps are on the usual right-hand side, but these do not have dedicated merge lanes, forcing drivers to await gaps in traffic and then accelerate from a stop sign to traffic speeds in a short distance. In 2016, a new on-ramp and off-ramp to Treasure Island were opened in the western direction on the right-hand side of the roadway, replacing the left-hand side off-ramp in that direction.

Rail service

Construction of the Bridge Railway began on November 29, 1937, with the laying of the first ties. The first train was run across the Bay Bridge on September 23, 1938, a test run utilizing a Key System train consisting of two articulated units with California Governor Frank Merriam at the controls. On January 14, 1939, the San Francisco Transbay Terminal was dedicated. The following morning, January 15, 1939, the electric commuter trains started in revenue service, running along the south side of the lower deck of the bridge. The terminal originally was supposed to open at the same time as the Bay Bridge, but had been delayed.

Trains over the Bridge Railway were operated by the Sacramento Northern Railroad (Western Pacific), the Interurban Electric Railway (Southern Pacific) and the Key System. Freight trains never used the bridge. The tracks left the lower deck in San Francisco just southwest of the end of 1st St. They then went along an elevated viaduct above city streets, looping around and into the terminal on its east end. Departing trains exited on the loop back onto the bridge. The loop continued to be used by buses until the terminal's closure in 2010. The tracks left the lower deck in Oakland. The Interurban Electric Railway tracks ran along Engineer Road and over the Southern Pacific yard on trestles (some of it is still standing and visible from nearby roadways) onto the streets and dedicated right-of-ways in Berkeley, Albany, Oakland and Alameda. The Sacramento Northern and Key System tracks went under the SP tracks through a tunnel (which still exists and is in use as an access to the EBMUD treatment plant) and onto 40th St. Due to falling ridership, Sacramento Northern and IER service ended in 1941.

On September 13, 1942, a stop was opened at Yerba Buena Island to serve expanded wartime needs on adjacent Treasure Island. After World War II Key System ridership began to fall as well. Despite the vital role the railroad played, the last train went over the bridge in April 1958. The tracks were removed and replaced with pavement on the Transbay Terminal ramps and Bay Bridge. The Key System handled buses over the bridge until 1960 when its successor, AC Transit, took over operations. It still handles service today, running to a new transbay terminal located in the same vicinity in San Francisco, the Transbay Transit Center. There have been several attempts to restore rail service on the bridge, but none have been successful.

1963 removal of rails

Automobile traffic increased dramatically in the ensuing decades while the Key System declined, and in October 1963, the Bay Bridge was reconfigured with five lanes of westbound traffic on the upper deck and five lanes of eastbound traffic on the lower deck. The Key System originally planned to end train operations in 1948 when it replaced its streetcars with buses, but Caltrans did not approve of this. Trucks were allowed on both decks and the railroad was removed. Owing to a lack of clearance for trucks through the upper-deck portion of the Yerba Buena tunnel, it was necessary to lower the elevation of the upper deck where it passes through the tunnel, and to correspondingly excavate to lower the elevation of the lower portion. Additionally, the upper deck was retrofitted to handle the increased loads due to trucks, with understringers added and prestressing added to the bottom of the floor beams. This retrofit is still in place and is visible to Eastbound traffic.

1968 aircraft accident
On February 11, 1968, a U.S. Navy training aircraft crashed into the cantilever span of the bridge, killing both reserve officers aboard. The T2V SeaStar, based at NAS Los Alamitos in southern California, was on a routine weekend mission and had just taken off in the fog from nearby NAS Alameda. There were no injuries among the motorists on the bridge. One of the truss sections of the bridges was replaced due to damage from the impact.

1986 Cable lighting
The series of lights adorning the suspension cables was added in 1986 as part of the bridge's 50th-anniversary celebration.

2001 terrorism threat
On November 2, 2001, in the aftermath of the September 11 attacks, Governor Gray Davis announced a threat of a rush hour attack against a West Coast suspension bridge (a group which includes the Bay Bridge and the Golden Gate Bridge) some time between November 2 and 7, resulting in increased armed law enforcement patrols.

A small fraction of drivers shifted to ferries and BART. It was later revealed that crews had secretly been working under armed guard for several weeks to harden the suspension cable attachment points, which were vulnerable to cutting with common tools. An anchor room was filled with concrete, doors welded shut, and a razor wire fence added. A blast wall was also added to defend against a truck bomb. In the end, no attack occurred.

2007 Cosco Busan oil spill
In 2007, a container ship then named the Cosco Busan, and subsequently renamed the Hanjin Venezia, allided with the Delta Tower fender, resulting in the Cosco Busan oil spill.

2013 public "light sculpture" installation

On March 5, 2013, a public art installation called "The Bay Lights" was activated on the western span's vertical cables. The installation was designed by artist Leo Villareal and consists of 25,000 LED lights originally scheduled to be on nightly display until March 2015. However, on December 17, 2014, the non-profit Illuminate The Arts announced that it had raised the $4 million needed to make the lights permanent; the display was temporarily turned off starting in March 2015 in order to perform maintenance and install sturdier bulbs and then re-lit on January 30, 2016.

In order to reduce driver distractions, the privately funded display is not visible to users of the bridge, only to distant observers. This lighting effort is intended to form part of a larger project to "light the bay". Villareal used various algorithms to generate patterns such as rainfall, reflections on water, bird flight, expanding rings, and others. Villareal's patterns and transitions will be sequenced and their duration determined by computerized random number generator to make each viewing experience unique. Owing to the efficiency of the LED system employed, the estimated operating cost is only US$15.00 per night.

The lights were switched off at 8pm on on March 5, 2023 – the 10th anniversary of the artwork – due to their poor condition and increasing maintenance costs. There is a plan to raise additional funds and install a new set of lights later in the year.

2020 Bus lane proposal
In January 2020, the AC Transit and BART boards of directors supported the establishment of dedicated bus lanes on the bridge. In February 2020, Rob Bonta introduced state legislation to begin planning bus lanes.

Earthquake damage and subsequent upgrades

On the evening of October 17, 1989 during the Loma Prieta earthquake, which measured 6.9 on the moment magnitude scale, a  section of the upper deck of the eastern truss portion of the bridge at Pier E9 collapsed onto the deck below, indirectly causing one death. The bridge was closed for just over a month as construction crews repaired the section. That same year, the bridge reopened to traffic on November 18.

Western section retrofitting
The western section has undergone extensive seismic retrofitting. During the retrofit, much of the structural steel supporting the bridge deck was replaced while the bridge remained open to traffic. Engineers accomplished this by using methods similar to those employed on the Chicago Skyway reconstruction project.

The entire bridge was fabricated using hot steel rivets, which are impossible to heat treat and so remain relatively soft. Analysis showed that these could fail by shearing under extreme stress. Therefore, at most locations, rivets were replaced with high-strength bolts. Most bolts had domed heads placed facing traffic so they looked similar to the rivets that were removed.. This work had to be performed with great care as the steel of the structure had for many years been painted with lead paint, which had to be carefully removed and contained by workers with extensive protective gear.

Most of the beams were originally constructed of two plate -beams joined with lattices of flat strip or angle stock, depending upon structural requirements. These have all been reconstructed by replacing the riveted lattice elements with bolted steel plate and so converting the lattice beams into box beams. This replacement included adding face plates to the large diagonal beams joining the faces of the main towers, which now have an improved appearance when viewed from certain angles.

Diagonal box beams have been added to each bay of the upper and lower decks of the western spans. These add stiffness to reduce side-to-side motion during an earthquake and reduce the probability of damage to the decking surfaces.

Analysis showed that some massive concrete supports could burst and crumble under likely stresses. In particular the western supports were extensively modified. First, the location of existing reinforcing bar is determined using magnetic techniques. In areas between bars holes are drilled. Into these holes is inserted and glued an L-shaped bar that protrudes . This bar is retained in the hole with a high-strength epoxy adhesive. The entire surface of the structure is thus covered with closely spaced protrusions. A network of horizontal and vertical reinforcing bars is then attached to these protrusions. Mold surface plates are then positioned to retain high-strength concrete, which is then pumped into the void. After removal of the formwork the surface appears similar to the original concrete. This technique has been applied elsewhere throughout California to improve freeway overpass abutments and some overpass central supports that have unconventional shapes. (Other techniques such as jacket and grout are applied to simple vertical posts; see the seismic retrofit article.)

The western approaches have also been retrofitted in part, but mostly these have been replaced with new construction of reinforced concrete.

Eastern section replacement

For various reasons, the eastern section would have been too expensive to retrofit compared to replacing it, so the decision was made to replace it.

The replacement section underwent a series of design changes, both progressive and regressive, with increasing cost estimates and contractor bids. The final design included a single-towered self-anchored suspension span starting at Yerba Buena island, leading to a long inclined 
viaduct to the Oakland touchdown.

Separated and protected bicycle lanes are a visually prominent feature on the south side of the new eastern section. The bikeway and pedestrian path across the eastern span opened in October 2016 and carries recreational and commuter cyclists between Oakland and Yerba Buena Island. The original eastern cantilever span had firefighting dry standpipes installed. No firefighting dry or wet standpipes were designed for the eastern section replacement, although, the firefighting wet standpipes do exist on the original western section visible on both the north-side upper and lower decks.

The original eastern section closed permanently to traffic on August 28, 2013, and the replacement span opened for traffic five days later. The old original eastern section was dismantled between January 2014 and November 2017.

October 2009 eyebar crack, repair failure and bridge closure
During the 2009 Labor Day weekend closure for a portion of the replacement, a major crack was found in an eyebar, significant enough to warrant bridge closure. Working in parallel with the retrofit, California Department of Transportation (Caltrans), and its contractors and subcontractors, were able to design, engineer, fabricate, and install the pieces required to repair the bridge, delaying its planned opening by only  hours. The repair was not inspected by the Federal Highway Administration, which relied on state inspection reports to ensure safety guidelines were met.

On October 27, 2009, during the evening commute, the steel crossbeam and two steel tie rods repaired over Labor Day weekend snapped off the Bay Bridge's eastern section and fell to the upper deck. Three vehicles were either struck by or hit the fallen debris, though there were no injuries. On November 1, Caltrans announced that the bridge would probably stay closed at least through the morning commute of Monday, November 2 after repairs performed during the weekend failed a stress test on Sunday. BART and the Golden Gate Ferry systems added supplemental service to accommodate the increased passenger load during the bridge closure. The bridge reopened to traffic on November 2, 2009.

The pieces that broke off on October 27 were a saddle, crossbars, and two tension rods.

Name

The bridge was unofficially "dedicated" to James B. "Sunny Jim" Rolph, Jr., but this was not widely recognized until the bridge's 50th-anniversary celebrations in 1986. The official name of the bridge for all functional purposes has always been the "San Francisco–Oakland Bay Bridge", and, by most local people, it is referred to simply as "the Bay Bridge".

Rolph, a Mayor of San Francisco from 1912 to 1931, was the Governor of California at the time construction of the bridge began. He died in office on June 2, 1934, two years before the bridge opened, leaving the bridge to be named for him out of respect.

Emperor Norton naming campaigns
In 1872, the San Francisco entrepreneur and eccentric Emperor Norton issued three proclamations calling for the design and construction of a suspension bridge between San Francisco and Oakland via Yerba Buena Island (formerly Goat Island).

A 1939 plaque honoring Emperor Norton for the original idea for the Bay Bridge was dedicated by the fraternal society E Clampus Vitus and was installed at The Cliff House in February 1955. In November 1986, in connection with the bridge's 50th anniversary, the plaque was moved to the Transbay Terminal, the public transit and Greyhound bus depot at the west end of the bridge in downtown San Francisco. When the terminal was closed in 2010, the plaque was placed in storage.

There have been two recent campaigns to name all, or parts, of the Bay Bridge for Emperor Norton.

2004
In November 2004, after a campaign by San Francisco Chronicle cartoonist Phil Frank, then-San Francisco District 3 Supervisor Aaron Peskin introduced a resolution to the San Francisco Board of Supervisors calling for the entire two-bridge system, from San Francisco to Oakland, to be named for Emperor Norton.

On December 14, 2004, the Board approved a modified version of this resolution, calling for only "new additions" — i.e., the new eastern crossing — to be named "The Emperor Norton Bridge". Neither the City of Oakland nor Alameda County passed any similar resolution, so the effort went no further.

2013–present
In June 2013, nine state assemblymen, joined by two state senators, introduced Assembly Concurrent Resolution No. 65 (ACR 65) to name the western crossing of the bridge for former California Assembly Speaker and former San Francisco Mayor Willie Brown. Six weeks later, a grassroots petition was launched seeking to name the entire two-bridge system for Emperor Norton. In September 2013, the petition's author launched a nonprofit, The Emperor's Bridge Campaign — now known as The Emperor Norton Trust — that advocates for adding "Emperor Norton Bridge" as an honorary name (rather than "renaming" the bridge) and that undertakes other efforts to advance Norton's legacy.

Willie L. Brown, Jr., Bridge (Western crossing)
The state legislative resolution naming the western section of the Bay Bridge the "Willie L. Brown, Jr., Bridge" passed the Assembly in August 2013 and the Senate in September 2013. A ceremony was held on February 11, 2014, marking the resolution and the installation of signs on either end of the section.

The larger entity of which the western section is a part retains the separate and independent designation "San Francisco–Oakland Bay Bridge".

Alexander Zuckermann Bike Path
The pedestrian and bicycle route on the eastern section opened on September 3, 2013, and is named after Alexander Zuckermann, founding chair of the East Bay Bicycle Coalition. This forms a transbay route for the San Francisco Bay Trail. Until October 2016, the path did not connect to Yerba Buena and Treasure Island sidewalks, due to the need to demolish more of the old eastern section before final construction. As of December 2016, the path is open only on weekends and holidays from 7 a.m. to 6 p.m. "to ensure public safety during torch cutting and other old Bay Bridge demolition activities". On May 2, 2017, public access was extended to seven days a week, 6 a.m. to 9 p.m., with occasional closure days for continued demolition of the old bridge foundations. This work was completed on November 11, 2017. Current facilities, maps and restrictions are published by Metropolitan Transportation Commission.

On October 21, 2020, the Judge John Sutter Regional Shoreline park opened to the public. Located at the foot of the bridge, the opening of the park has led to easier access to the bike and pedestrian path due to improved parking and pedestrian access.

Financing and tolls

Current toll rates
Tolls are only collected from westbound traffic at the toll plaza on the Oakland side of the bridge. Those just traveling between Yerba Buena Island and the main part of San Francisco are not tolled. All-electronic tolling has been in effect since 2020, and drivers may either pay using the FasTrak electronic toll collection device, using the license plate tolling program, or via a one time payment online. Effective , the regular toll rate for passenger cars on weekends is $7. Under a congestion pricing scheme on weekdays, the rate increases to $8 during peak traffic hours and decreases to $6 during non-peak hours. Also during peak traffic hours, carpool vehicles carrying three or more people, clean air vehicles, or motorcycles may pay a discounted toll of $3.50 if they have FasTrak and use the designated carpool lane. Drivers must pay within 48 hours after crossing the bridge or they will be sent a toll violation invoice. No additional fees will be added to the toll violation if it is paid within 21 days.

Historical toll rates
When the Bay Bridge opened in 1936, the toll was 65 cents, collected in each direction by men in booths fronting each lane of traffic. Within months, the toll was lowered to 50 cents in order to compete with the ferry system, and finally to 25 cents since this was shown sufficient to pay off the original revenue bonds on schedule (equivalent to $ and $ in  respectively). In 1951 there were eighty collectors working various shifts.

On Monday, September 1, 1969, (Labor Day) a change of policy resulted in the toll being collected thereafter only from westbound traffic, at twice the previous rate; eastbound vehicles were toll-exempt.

Tolls were subsequently raised to finance improvements to the bridge approaches, required to connect with new freeways, and to subsidize public transit in order to reduce the traffic over the bridge. The toll was increased by a quarter dollar to 75 cents in 1978 (equivalent to $ in ), where it remained for a decade.

Caltrans, the state highway transportation agency, maintains seven of the eight San Francisco Bay Area bridges. (The Golden Gate Bridge is owned and maintained by the Golden Gate Bridge, Highway and Transportation District.)

The basic toll (for automobiles) on the seven state bridges was raised to $1 by Regional Measure 1, approved by Bay Area voters in 1988.

A $1 seismic retrofit surcharge was added in 1998 by the state legislature, originally for eight years, but since then extended to December 2037 (AB1171, October 2001). On March 2, 2004, voters approved Regional Measure 2, raising the toll by another dollar to a total of three dollars (equivalent to $ in ). An additional dollar was added to the toll starting January 1, 2007, to cover cost overruns concerning the replacement of the eastern span.

The Metropolitan Transportation Commission, a regional transportation agency, in its capacity as the Bay Area Toll Authority, administers RM1 and RM2 funds, a significant portion of which are allocated to public transit capital improvements and operating subsidies in the transportation corridors served by the bridges. Caltrans administers the "second dollar" seismic surcharge, and receives some of the MTC-administered funds to perform other maintenance work on the bridges. The Bay Area Toll Authority is made up of appointed officials put in place by various city and county governments, and is not subject to direct voter oversight.

Due to further funding shortages for seismic retrofit projects, the Bay Area Toll Authority again raised tolls on all Bay Area bridges in its control (this excludes the Golden Gate Bridge) in July 2010. The toll rate for autos on other Bay Area bridges was increased to five dollars, but in the Bay Bridge a variable pricing tolling scheme based on congestion was implemented. The Bay Bridge congestion pricing scheme charged a $6 toll from 5 a.m. to 10 a.m. and 3 p.m. to 7 p.m., Monday through Friday. During weekends cars paid $5. Carpools before the implementation were exempted but began to pay $2.50, and the carpool toll discount became available only to drivers with FasTrak electronic toll devices. The toll remained at the previous toll of $4 at all other times on weekdays. The Bay Area Toll Authority reported that by October 2010 fewer users are driving during the peak hours and more vehicles are crossing the Bay Bridge before and after the 5–10 a.m. period in which the congestion toll goes into effect. Commute delays in the first six months dropped by an average of 15% compared with 2009. For vehicles with at least 3 axles, the toll rate was $5 per axle.

In June 2018, Bay Area voters approved Regional Measure 3 to further raise the tolls on all seven of the state-owned bridges to fund $4.5 billion worth of transportation improvements in the area. Under the passed measure, the tolls on the Bay Bridge will be raised by $1 on January 1, 2019, then again on January 1, 2022, and again on January 1, 2025. Thus under the congestion pricing scheme, the tolls for autos during the peak weekday rush hours will be $7 in 2019, $8 in 2022, and $9 in 2025; for the non-rush periods, $5 in 2019, $6 in 2022, and $7 in 2025; and on weekends, $6 in 2019, $7 in 2022, and $8 in 2025.

In September 2019, the MTC approved a $4 million plan to eliminate toll takers and convert all seven of the state-owned bridges to all-electronic tolling, citing that 80 percent of drivers are now using Fastrak and the change would improve traffic flow. On March 20, 2020, accelerated by the COVID-19 pandemic, all-electronic tolling was placed in effect for all seven state-owned toll bridges. The MTC then installed new systems at all seven bridges to make them permanently cashless by the start of 2021. In April 2022, the Bay Area Toll Authority announced plans to remove all remaining unused toll booths and create an open-road tolling system which functions at highway speeds.

See also

 49-Mile Scenic Drive
 Bay Bridge Troll
 Cosco Busan oil spill
 Golden Gate Bridge
 List of bridges documented by the Historic American Engineering Record in California
 Southern Crossing (California) - proposed parallel bridge
 Treasure Island Development

References
Notes

Bibliography
 
 Petroski, Henry. (1995). Engineers of Dreams: Great Bridge Builders and the Spanning of America. New York: Alfred A. Knopf. .
 Reisner, Marc (1999). A Dangerous Place: California's Unsettling Fate. Penguin Books.
 
 San Francisco-Oakland Bay Bridge East Span Seismic Safety Project. Retrieved August 24, 2005.

External links

Official sites:
 Bay Area FasTrak – includes toll information on this and the other Bay Area toll facilities
 baybridgeinfo.org Site by Caltrans about all current construction on the bridge.
 California Department of Transportation (Caltrans) official Bay Bridge site

Journals:
 
 
 

Media:
  (17 minutes)
 
 Lower Deck Rail and Roadway Off Ramps, 1939, Dorothea Lange photo
 San Francisco-Oakland Bay Bridge Construction Collection MSS 722.
 Special Collections & Archives, UC San Diego Library.
 "Bridging San Francisco Bay", PDH Online Course C577

Other:
 Bay Bridge Oral History Project, Bancroft Library, UC Berkeley
 "Symphonies in Steel: Bay Bridge and the Golden Gate" at The Virtual Museum of the City of San Francisco
 
 
 
 
 
 

Bridge disasters in the United States
Bridge disasters caused by earthquakes
Bridges completed in 1936
Bridges in the San Francisco Bay Area
Bridges on the Interstate Highway System
Road bridges on the National Register of Historic Places in California
Buildings and structures in Oakland, California
Cantilever bridges
Double-decker bridges
Historic American Engineering Record in California
Historic Civil Engineering Landmarks
Interstate 80
San Francisco Bay
Self-anchored suspension bridges
Suspension bridges in California
Toll bridges in California
Tolled sections of Interstate Highways
Transportation in Oakland, California
Bridges in San Francisco
U.S. Route 40
U.S. Route 50
National Register of Historic Places in San Francisco
Road-rail bridges in the United States
Railroad bridges in California
Landmarks in the San Francisco Bay Area
Transportation disasters in California
Transport disasters in 1989
Bridges in Alameda County, California
San Francisco Bay Trail
Railroad bridges on the National Register of Historic Places in California
Steel bridges in the United States
Concrete bridges in California
1936 establishments in California